Macadamia tetraphylla is a tree in the family Proteaceae, native to southern Queensland and northern New South Wales in Australia.  Common names include macadamia nut, bauple nut, prickly macadamia, Queensland nut, rough-shelled bush nut and rough-shelled Queensland nut.

This species has dense foliage and grows up to 18 metres in height. The leaves, which have toothed margins, are 7 to 25 cm in length. As the species name "tetraphylla" implies, it usually has four leaves more or less equally spaced around each leaf node, whereas the other main commercial species "integrifolia" has a variable leaf number but usually three.  It has long, pendant white to creamy pink to purple flowers, followed by woody, rounded fruits which are 2 to 3 cm in diameter and contain edible seeds. As one common name implies, the shell of this species is often dimpled or "rough shelled" as compared to the integrifolia, which has a smooth shell, and always white flowers.

It has been introduced to Mexico and has done well in the states of Michoacán and Jalisco and has become an important export crop for the Mexican market. Hawaii is the largest exporter of this crop worldwide.  Both species of Macadamia have not done well in the pure tropics, with no fully successful plantations less than 15 degrees from the equator.  Major plantations in Costa Rica, at 10 degrees north, are said to produce much less than in Hawaii at 19 to 22 degrees north, in one case 20% the production.  Plantations in Guatemala at 15 degrees north are successful.  However, individual seedling trees have produced well in the pure tropics and need to be selected. One grower noted that the integrifolia flowers in Costa Rica have no aroma, leading to low and erratic pollination.  Macadamia tetraphylla has a higher sugar content than integrifolia, leading to problems of burning when baked in cookies and other desserts, thus most commercial macadamias are of the integrifolia species to assure conformity of roasting and baking results.  Many tetraphylla or hybrids of tetraphylla and integrifolia are grown in home orchards. The higher sugar content of tetraphylla is preferred by some, especially for eating raw.

First modern Australian native food crop
Macadamia tetraphylla was the first Australian native food plant to be grown by non-indigenous Australians as a commercial crop. The first commercial plantation of macadamia trees were planted in the early 1880s by Charles Staff at Rous Mill, 12 km southeast of Lismore, New South Wales, consisting of M. tetraphylla. Seedlings from the original plantation were used as rootstock for grafted modern varieties well into the 20th century. This original plantation was finally cleared and replaced with grafted modern varieties in the 1990s.

Ironically, even as the macadamia has spread worldwide in commercial agriculture, it is now listed as a vulnerable species in its native Australia due to habitat loss and degradation. The loss and impoverishment of its habitat has resulted from clearance of lowland rainforest for agriculture and urban development; invasive weeds; and poorly-designed fire management systems.

Health claims
Like many other nuts, as well as olives, macadamia nuts are high in monounsaturated fatty acids (containing approximately 86%). Monounsaturated fatty acids have been linked to reduced cholesterol in the blood.

The FDA has approved for manufacturers of macadamia products to use this verbiage, “Supportive but not conclusive research shows that eating 1.5 ounces per day of macadamia nuts, as part of a diet low in saturated fat and cholesterol and not resulting in increased intake of saturated fat or calories may reduce the risk of coronary heart disease. See nutrition information for fat [and calorie] content.” It is important to note that this is a "qualified health claim" and not meeting the rigorous standard of "significant scientific agreement".

References

 

Bushfood
Edible nuts and seeds
tetraphylla
Crops originating from Australia
Flora of New South Wales
Flora of Queensland
Proteales of Australia
Trees of Australia
Vulnerable flora of Australia